Elena Schiavo is an Italian footballer who played as a midfielder for the Italy women's national football team. She was part of the team at the 1971 Women's World Cup.

References

Women's association football midfielders
Italian women's footballers
Italy women's international footballers
Serie A (women's football) players